Arippara eogenalis is a species of snout moth. It was described by Pieter Cornelius Tobias Snellen in 1880 and is found in Indonesia (including Sumatra).

References

Pyralini
Moths described in 1892